Lynn Loyns (born February 21, 1981) is a Canadian former professional ice hockey left winger. A free agent signing by the San Jose Sharks in 2001, he played 34 games in the National Hockey League for the Sharks and Calgary Flames, scoring three goals and two assists in that time. The rest of his career, which lasted from 2001 to 2014, was spent in the minor American Hockey League and then in various European leagues.

Personal life
Born in Naicam, Saskatchewan, Loyns married his sweetheart, Gia, on July 24, 2010 in Boston, MA, then held a reception in Calgary, Alberta a month later.

Career statistics

Regular season and playoffs

References

External links
 

1981 births
Living people
Calgary Flames players
Canadian ice hockey left wingers
Cleveland Barons (2001–2006) players
DEG Metro Stars players
EC VSV players
HC Pustertal Wölfe players
Ice hockey people from Saskatchewan
Krefeld Pinguine players
Lowell Lock Monsters players
Nottingham Panthers players
Omaha Ak-Sar-Ben Knights players
Ravensburg Towerstars players
San Jose Sharks players
Spokane Chiefs players
Undrafted National Hockey League players